Petra Reuvekamp is a Dutch Paralympic swimmer. She represented the Netherlands at the 1996 Summer Paralympics held in Atlanta, Georgia, United States where she won one silver medal and two bronze medals.

She won the silver medal in the women's 400 m freestyle S8 event and the bronze medals in the women's 100 m freestyle S8 and women's 100 m breaststroke SB7 events.

References

External links 
 

Living people
Year of birth missing (living people)
Place of birth missing (living people)
Dutch female breaststroke swimmers
Dutch female freestyle swimmers
Swimmers at the 1996 Summer Paralympics
Medalists at the 1996 Summer Paralympics
Paralympic silver medalists for the Netherlands
Paralympic bronze medalists for the Netherlands
Paralympic medalists in swimming
Paralympic swimmers of the Netherlands
Medalists at the World Para Swimming Championships
S8-classified Paralympic swimmers
20th-century Dutch women
20th-century Dutch people